Juno Stover-Irwin (November 22, 1928 – July 2, 2011) was a four-time Olympic diver for the United States in 1948, 1952, 1956 and 1960  Primarily a 10-meter platform performer, Irwin was a native of Los Angeles, California; she attended Hoover High School and Glendale Community College.
Juno was three and a half months pregnant when she took the Bronze medal at the Helsinki Olympic Games. She travelled to competitions with her ukulele which she played for relaxation and enjoyment.

Biography
As Juno Stover, she placed fifth at the 1948 Olympics in London. Four years later in Helsinki, as Juno Stover-Irwin, she captured a bronze medal. At the 1956 Olympics, in Melbourne, Australia, Stover-Irwin was the 10-meter platform silver medalist. Irwin would later become the first diver to compete in four Olympics, when she placed fourth at the 1960 Games in Rome. Stover-Irwin was also a two-time USA National AAU champion and two-time Pan-American Games silver medalist.

Upon retiring from active competition, Stover-Irwin coached the women’s diving team at California State University (Berkeley Campus). She was honored with induction to the International Swimming Hall of Fame in 1980. She was the mother of four children born between 1952 and 1965.

See also
 List of members of the International Swimming Hall of Fame
Diving at the 1952 Olympics
Diving at the 1956 Olympics
Diving at the 1955 Pan-American Games
Diving at the 1959 Pan-American Games

References

1928 births
2011 deaths
Divers at the 1948 Summer Olympics
Divers at the 1952 Summer Olympics
Divers at the 1956 Summer Olympics
Divers at the 1960 Summer Olympics
American female divers
Sportspeople from Los Angeles
Medalists at the 1956 Summer Olympics
Medalists at the 1952 Summer Olympics
Pan American Games silver medalists for the United States
Olympic silver medalists for the United States in diving
Olympic bronze medalists for the United States in diving
Pan American Games medalists in diving
Divers at the 1959 Pan American Games
Divers at the 1955 Pan American Games
Medalists at the 1955 Pan American Games
Medalists at the 1959 Pan American Games
21st-century American women